The 2008–09 network television schedule for the six major English language commercial broadcast networks in the United States. The schedule covers prime time hours from September 2008 through August 2009. The schedule is followed by a list per network of returning series, new series, and series cancelled after the 2007–08 season. The schedule omits the Public Broadcasting Service (whose programming is listed here).

NBC was the first to announce its fall schedule on April 2, 2008, followed by ABC and The CW on May 13, CBS on May 14, Fox on May 15, and MyNetworkTV on May 22, 2008. The CW unveiled its Sunday lineup on May 27, 2008.

PBS is not included; member stations have local flexibility over most of their schedules and broadcasts times for network shows may vary.

New series are highlighted in bold.

All times are U.S. Eastern and Pacific Time (except for some live sports or events). Subtract for one hour for Central, Mountain, Alaska and Hawaii-Aleutian times.

Each of the 30 highest-rated shows is listed with its rank and rating as determined by Nielsen Media Research.

Legend

Sunday

Note: On Sundays, The CW programming begins at 6:30 p.m. (EST).
Note: CBS' Sunday Night primetime lineup is often delayed due to NFL on CBS game coverage running longer than scheduled, except in the Pacific and Mountain time zones, where the lineup airs as scheduled.
Note: The 7 p.m. hour on Fox features animated series reruns in the Pacific and Mountain time zones during the NFL season.

Monday

Tuesday

Wednesday

Thursday

Note: The Moment of Truth was originally scheduled to air Thursdays at 8:00 on Fox, but was instead shelved, effectively canceling it.

Friday

Saturday

By network

ABC

Returning series:
20/20
ABC Saturday Movie of the Week
According to Jim
America's Funniest Home Videos
The Bachelor
The Bachelorette
Boston Legal
Brothers & Sisters
Dancing with the Stars
Desperate Housewives
Dirty Sexy Money
Eli Stone
Extreme Makeover: Home Edition
Grey's Anatomy
Here Come the Newlyweds
I Survived a Japanese Game Show
Just for Laughs
Lost
Primetime
Primetime: What Would You Do?
Private Practice
Pushing Daisies
Samantha Who?
Saturday Night Football
Scrubs (moved from NBC)
Supernanny
Ugly Betty
Who Wants to Be a Millionaire?
Wife Swap
Wipeout

New series:
Better Off Ted *
Castle *
Crash Course *
Cupid *
Dating in the Dark *
Defying Gravity *
The Goode Family *
Homeland Security USA
In the Motherhood *
Life on Mars
Opportunity Knocks
Shaq Vs. *
Shark Tank *
The Superstars *
Surviving Suburbia *
True Beauty *
The Unusuals *

Not returning from 2007–08:
ABC Friday Night Movie
Big Shots
Carpoolers
Cashmere Mafia
Cavemen
Dance Machine
Dance War: Bruno vs. Carrie Ann
Duel
High School Musical: Get in the Picture
Hopkins
Men in Trees
Miss Guided
The Mole
Notes from the Underbelly
October Road
Oprah's Big Give
Wanna Bet?
Women's Murder Club
The Wonderful World of Disney

CBS

Returning series:
48 Hours
60 Minutes
The Amazing Race
The Big Bang Theory
Big Brother
Cold Case
Criminal Minds
CSI: Crime Scene Investigation
CSI: Miami
CSI: NY
Flashpoint
Ghost Whisperer
How I Met Your Mother
Million Dollar Password
NCIS
The New Adventures of Old Christine
Numb3rs
Rules of Engagement
Survivor
Two and a Half Men
The Unit
Without a Trace

New series:
Eleventh Hour
EliteXC Saturday Night Fights
The Ex List
Game Show in My Head *
Gary Unmarried
Harper's Island *
The Mentalist
There Goes the Neighborhood *
Worst Week

Not returning from 2007–08:
Cane
Jericho (reruns to broadcast on The CW, from late 2008)
Kid Nation
Moonlight
Power of 10
Secret Talents of the Stars
Shark
Swingtown
Viva Laughlin
Welcome to The Captain

The CW

Returning series:
America's Next Top Model
Everybody Hates Chris
The Game
Gossip Girl
One Tree Hill
Reaper
Smallville
Supernatural

New series:
13: Fear is Real *
90210
The CW Sunday Night Movie
Easy Money
Hitched or Ditched *
In Harm's Way
Privileged
Stylista
Valentine

Not returning from 2007–08:
Aliens in America
Beauty and the Geek
Crowned: The Mother of All Pageants
CW Now
Farmer Wants a Wife (returned for 2022-23 on Fox)
Girlfriends
Life Is Wild
Online Nation
Pussycat Dolls Present:
WWE SmackDown (moved to MyNetworkTV)

Fox

Returning series:
24
America's Most Wanted
American Dad!
American Idol
Are You Smarter than a 5th Grader?
Bones
COPS
Don't Forget the Lyrics!
Family Guy
Hell's Kitchen
House
King of the Hill
Kitchen Nightmares
The Moment of Truth
NFL on Fox
The OT
Prison Break
The Simpsons
So You Think You Can Dance
Terminator: The Sarah Connor Chronicles
'Til Death

New series:
Dollhouse *
Do Not Disturb
Fringe
Hole in the Wall
Lie to Me *
Mental *
More to Love *
Osbournes Reloaded *
Secret Millionaire
Sit Down, Shut Up *

Not returning from 2007–08:
Back to You
Canterbury's Law
Fox Friday Night Movie
K-Ville
Nashville
New Amsterdam
The Next Great American Band
The Return of Jezebel James
Unhitched

MyNetworkTV

Returning series:
Magic's Biggest Secrets Revealed
Celebrity Exposé
Jail
Masters of Illusion
My Thursday Night Movie
My Saturday Night Movie
Street Patrol
Under One Roof
WWE SmackDown (moved from The CW)

New series:
Dead Man Running
Shaken, Not Stirred
The Tony Rock Project
Vice Squad
World's Funniest Moments

Not returning from 2007–08:
The Academy
The Best of In Living Color
Control Room Presents
Decision House
IFL Battleground
Meet My Folks
My Friday Night Movie
My Wednesday Night Movie
NFL Total Access
Paradise Hotel 2
Whacked Out Videos

NBC

Returning series:
30 Rock
America's Got Talent
The Celebrity Apprentice 2
The Biggest Loser
Chuck
Dateline NBC
Deal or No Deal
ER
Football Night in America
Heroes
I'm a Celebrity...Get Me Out of Here!
Law & Order
Law & Order: Special Victims Unit
Life
Lipstick Jungle
Medium
My Name Is Earl
NBC Sunday Night Football
The Office

New series:
America's Toughest Jobs
The Chopping Block *
Crusoe
The Great American Road Trip *
Howie Do It *
Kath & Kim
Kings *
Knight Rider
The Listener *
Merlin *
Momma's Boys
My Own Worst Enemy
Parks and Recreation *
The Philanthropist *
Saturday Night Live Weekend Update Thursday
Southland *
Superstars of Dance *

Not returning from 2007–08:
1 vs. 100 (moved to GSN)
American Gladiators
Amnesia
The Baby Borrowers
Bionic Woman
Celebrity Circus
Celebrity Family Feud (moved to ABC in 2014–15)
Clash of the Choirs
Fear Itself
Friday Night Lights (moved to The 101 Network)
Journeyman
Last Comic Standing
Las Vegas
Most Outrageous Moments
My Dad Is Better Than Your Dad
Nashville Star
Phenomenon
Quarterlife
Scrubs (moved to ABC)
The Singing Bee (moved to CMT)

Renewals and Cancellations

Full-season pickups

ABC
Private Practice – On October 22, 2008, it was picked up for a full-season order.
Samantha Who? – On October 31, 2008, it received a full-season order, adding seven episodes.

CBS
Gary Unmarried – On November 14, 2008, it was picked up for a full 22-episode season.
The Mentalist – On October 15, 2008, it was picked up for a full-season order.

The CW
90210 – On September 22, 2008, it was picked up for a full-season order.

Fox
Fringe – On October 1, 2008, it was picked up for a full-season order.
Terminator: The Sarah Connor Chronicles – On October 17, 2008, it was picked up for a full-season order, despite its declining ratings this season.
'Til Death – Despite lower ratings, Fox ordered a fourth season of the show.

MyNetworkTV
WWE SmackDown – The only program to carry over in the network's conversion to a programming service.

NBC
Chuck – On August 28, 2008, it was picked up for a full-season order, one month before the new season even premiered.
Knight Rider – On October 21, 2008, it was picked up for a full-season order, then on December 3, 2008, NBC cut the order down to 17.
Kath & Kim – On October 31, 2008, was given a full-season order.
Life – On November 7, 2008, NBC picked up Life for a full season.
Howie Do It – Twelve additional episodes were ordered by NBC.

Renewals

ABC
Brothers & Sisters – Renewed for a fourth season on April 23, 2009.
Castle – Renewed for a second season on May 15, 2009.
Desperate Housewives – Renewed for a sixth season.
Grey's Anatomy – Renewed for a sixth season on April 23, 2009.
Scrubs – Renewed for a ninth season.
Shark Tank – Renewed for a second season on August 2009.

CBS
The Amazing Race – Renewed for a fifteenth season on April 17, 2009.
The Big Bang Theory – Renewed for a third and fourth season on March 18, 2009.
Cold Case Renewed for a seventh season.
Criminal Minds – Renewed for a fifth season.
CSI: Crime Scene Investigation – Renewed for a tenth season.
CSI: Miami – Renewed for a eighth season.
CSI: NY – Renewed for a sixth season.
How I Met Your Mother – Renewed for a fifth season.
Gary Unmarried – Renewed for a second season.
Ghost Whisperer – Renewed for a fifth season.
The Mentalist – Renewed for a second season.
NCIS – Renewed for a seventh season.
The New Adventures of Old Christine – Renewed for a fith season.
Numb3rs – Renewed for a sixth season.
Rules of Engagement – Renewed for a forth season.
Survivor – Renewed for a sixth season.
Two and a Half Men – Renewed for a seventh, eighth and ninth season on March 18, 2009.

The CW
90210 – Renewed for a second and third season.
Gossip Girl – Renewed for a fourth season.
One Tree Hill – Renewed for a seventh season.
Smallville – Renewed for a ninth season.
Supernatural – Renewed for a fifth season.

Fox
24 – Renewed for a eighth and final season.
American Dad! – Renewed for a fith and sixth season on October 30, 2009.
Bones – Renewed for a fifth and sixth season on May 16, 2009.
Dollhouse – Renewed for a second season.
Family Guy – Renewed for a eighth and ninth season.
Fringe – Renewed for a second season.
House – Renewed for a sixth season.
Lie to Me – Renewed for a second season.
The Simpsons – Renewed for a twenty-first and twenty-second season on February 26, 2009.
'Til Death – Renewed for a fourth season.

NBC
30 Rock – Renewed for a fourth season.
The Apprentice – Renewed for a ninth season.
Chuck – Renewed for a third season.
Heroes – Renewed for a fourth season.
Law & Order – Renewed for a twentieth season.
Law & Order: Special Victims Unit – Renewed for a eleventh season.
The Office – Renewed for a sixth season.
Parks and Recreation – Renewed for a second season.

Cancellations/Series endings

ABC
According to Jim – Cast member Larry Joe Campbell announced in December 2008 that the sets had been bulldozed.
Boston Legal – It was announced on May 13, 2008 that season five would be the final season. The series concluded on December 8, 2008.
Cupid – Canceled on May 18, 2009.
Defying Gravity – Canceled during the summer after five low rated episodes.
Dirty Sexy Money – On November 20, 2008, ABC decided not to order further episodes for this current season resulting in the show being "effectively cancelled".
Eli Stone – On November 20, 2008, ABC decided not to order further episodes for this current season resulting in the show being "effectively cancelled".
The Goode Family – Canceled on August 8, 2009.
Homeland Security USA – Due to declining ratings, ABC has decided to pull the remaining episodes of the season.
In the Motherhood – Due to poor ratings, ABC did not show the remaining episodes of this series.
Just for Laughs – Canceled on April 7, 2010, after three seasons.
Life on Mars – Canceled on March 3, 2009. The series aired its last episode on April 1, 2009.
Opportunity Knocks – On October 16, 2008, the show was placed on hiatus after three episodes to make room for the Dancing with the Stars recap show. ABC planned on airing the six remaining episodes as part of their summer schedule, but this never materialized.
Pushing Daisies – On November 20, 2008, ABC decided not to order further episodes for this current season resulting in the show being "effectively cancelled".
Samantha Who? – Canceled on May 18, 2009, after two seasons, but this show will not return for a third season.
Surviving Suburbia – Canceled on August 8, 2009.
The Unusuals – Canceled on May 17, 2009.

CBS
Eleventh Hour – Canceled on May 19, 2009.
Elite XC Saturday Night Fights – On October 20, Elite XC shut down operations, thus cancelling the show.
The Ex List – This was the first new drama of the season  cancelled. The series was replaced with repeats of CBS dramas and new episodes of The Price Is Right Primetime.
Game Show in My Head – Due to declining ratings, CBS decided not to air any more episodes.
Harper's Island Cancelled on July 14, 2009. 
Million Dollar Password – Canceled due to declining ratings.
The Unit – Canceled on May 19, 2009, after four seasons. 
Worst Week – Canceled on May 20, 2009.
Without a Trace – Canceled on May 19, 2009, after seven seasons.

The CW
13: Fear Is Real – Canceled on May 21, 2009.
4Real – Canceled on May 21, 2009.
The CW Sunday Night Movie - Canceled on May 21, 2009.
Easy Money – MRC canceled the series on November 16, 2008.
Everybody Hates Chris – Chris Rock chose to end the series after four seasons.
The Game – Cancelled on May 20, 2009. Moved to BET in January 2011.
In Harm's Way – The CW decided to get end the MRC Sunday night on November 23, 2008, effectively canceling the show.
Privileged – Canceled on May 19, 2009.
Reaper – Canceled on May 20, 2009, after two seasons.
Stylista – Canceled on May 21, 2009.
Valentine – Canceled on November 23, 2008.

Fox
Are You Smarter than a 5th Grader? – Fox has announced that the show will not be returning for another season in the fall. On November 6, 2014, it was announced that the series would return for a sixth season.
Do Not Disturb – On September 25, 2008, the show was canceled after three episodes. It became the first cancellation of the season.
Don't Forget the Lyrics! – Canceled on August 4, 2009, after two seasons. On April 28, 2021, it was announced that the series would return for a fourth season.
Hole in the Wall – Due to poor ratings, Fox has canceled the show. It later moved to Cartoon Network.
King of the Hill – It was announced on August 14, 2008 that season thirteen would be the final season. The series concluded on September 13, 2009. On January 31, 2023, it was announced that Hulu picked up the revival.
More to Love – Canceled on March 9, 2010.
Osbournes Reloaded – Canceled on August 6, 2009.
Prison Break – On January 13, 2009, Fox entertainment President Kevin Reilly announced that "this will be the last year" of Prison Break.
Sit Down, Shut Up – Canceled on May 18, 2009.
Terminator: The Sarah Connor Chronicles – Canceled on May 18, 2009, after two seasons.

MyNetworkTV

The entire schedule of programs for MyNetworkTV except for WWE Smackdown! did not pass on to the 2009/10 season due to the network's conversion to a programming service.

Celebrity Exposé
Comics Unleashed (syndicated program on MyNetworkTV's schedule)
Jail
Magic's Biggest Secrets Revealed
Masters of Illusion
My Saturday Night Movie (the network's time on Saturday nights was given back to local affiliates for their own purposes)
Street Patrol
The Tony Rock Project
The Twilight Zone (repeats of 2002 UPN series)
Under One Roof
Vice Squad
Whacked Out Videos
World's Funniest Moments

NBC
America's Toughest Jobs – It was announced on March 13, 2009, that the series would not be returning for a second season.
The Chopping Block – On March 26, 2009 the show was canceled due to poor ratings.
Crusoe
Deal or No Deal – Canceled on May 19, 2009. The syndicated version of the show got picked up by MyNetworkTV when it transitioned to a programming service.
ER – It was announced on April 2, 2008 that season fifteen would be the final season. The series concluded on April 2, 2009.
Howie Do It – Canceled on May 19, 2009.
Kath & Kim – Canceled on May 19, 2009.
Kings – NBC moved Kings to Saturday and did not order more episodes.
Knight Rider – Canceled on May 19, 2009.
Life – Canceled on May 4, 2009, after two seasons.
Lipstick Jungle – Canceled on March 28, 2009, after two seasons.
The Listener – On July 23, 2009, NBC pulled the remaining episodes of the series due to declining ratings.
Medium – It was announced on May 19, 2009 that Medium will be moving to CBS next season.
Merlin – Canceled during the summer due to declining ratings.
Momma's Boys – Canceled on March 13, 2009, when it was confirmed not be returning for a second season.
My Name Is Earl – Cancelled on May 19, 2009, after four seasons.
My Own Worst Enemy – Canceled on November 12, 2008.
The Philanthropist – Canceled during the summer due to declining ratings.
Superstars of Dance – On May 19, 2009, it was announced that NBC would not be ordering a second season of the show.

See also
2008-09 Canadian network television schedule
2008-09 United States network television schedule (daytime)
2008-09 United States network television schedule (late night)

Top weekly ratings 
 Data sources: AC Nielsen, TV By The Numbers

Total Viewers

18-49 Viewers

References

United States primetime network television schedules
2008 in American television
2009 in American television